Dongting Lake is a large, shallow lake in northeastern Hunan Province, China. It is a flood basin of the Yangtze River, so its volume depends on the season. The provinces of Hubei and Hunan are named after their location relative to the lake: Hubei means "North of the Lake" and Hunan, "South of the Lake".

Dongting Lake is famous in Chinese culture as the place of origin of dragon boat racing. It is the site of Junshan Island and is home to the finless porpoise, an endangered species.

Geography

In the July–September period, flood water from the Yangtze flows into the lake, enlarging it greatly. The lake is also fed by four major rivers: the Xiang, Zi, Yuan and Li rivers. Small rivers also flow in, the most famous one being Miluo River where poet Qu Yuan committed suicide. In addition, the Xiao River flows into the Xiang near Yongzhou, before the Xiang flows into the lake. Ocean-going vessels can travel through the Xiang to reach Changsha.

History
The earliest rice paddies yet discovered in the world were in the Liyang plain, which was then on the western edge of Dongting lake. The state of Chu occupied the region in the Eastern Zhou period, and its territory there was taken over by Qin in the 3rd century BCE. During the Han Dynasty, Yunmeng Marsh ( literally "Great Marsh of Cloud Dream"), which lies to the north of Dongting Lake in Hubei Province, served as the main flood-basin of the Yangtze. The rich sediment of the marsh attracted farmers. Embankments were built, keeping the river out, and the Dongting Lake area south of the Yangtze gradually became the river's main flood-basin. The Han state was actively involved in the colonization of the region, maintaining dikes in Liyang to protect farmland from flooding.

At that time, Dongting Lake was China's largest freshwater lake. Because of its size, it gained the name Eight-hundred-li-Dongting. Nowadays, it is the second-largest, after Poyang Lake, as much of the lake has been turned into farmland.

Culture and mythology

The area is well known in Chinese history and literature. "Dongting" literally means "Grotto Court", and the lake was named for the huge hall or cavern, which was believed to exist beneath the lake, where the spirits of the Sage-King Shun's wives Ehuang and Nüying were said to be the rulers of this grotto, which was claimed to have underground passages opening to all parts of the empire. Dragon boat racing is said to have begun on the eastern shores of Dongting Lake as a search for the body of Qu Yuan, the Chu poet (340–278 BC), and a dragon-king is said to live at the bottom of the lake.

Junshan was also named after the goddess-wives of Shun, who lived there after his death by drowning, while they mourned him and sought for his body all the way from the source of the Xiang River, in which he drowned, and then on down to where it could have drifted, into the lake. Junshan Island, a former Taoist retreat, is a famous -wide island with 72 peaks in the middle of the lake. The island is also famous for its Junshan Yinzhen tea. The basin of Dongting Lake and its surrounding area is famous for its scenic beauty, which has been encapsulated in the phrase "Hunan of the Xiao and Xiang rivers".

The scenery of the Jiuyi Mountains and of the Xiao and Xiang rivers below is often mentioned in Chinese poetry. The late Tang Dynasty poet Yu Wuling is supposed to have been fond of the scenery of Dongting Lake. During the Song Dynasty, it became the fashion to paint this region's scenery in a set of eight scenes, usually entitled as Eight Views of Xiaoxiang. It is also said that Han Shizhong settled in the region after retired from military service. The fashion spread to Japan, where eventually other famous places were substituted for the Xiao and Xiang rivers.  One of the famous ponds based on the geography of the lake is at the Daikaku-ji in Kyoto.

Environmental issues

The agricultural colonization of the region began in ancient times, and by the 19th century much of the lake's shallower areas had been destroyed to create farmland. After 1949 a new round of wetland drainage destroyed much of what remained, leaving only a fraction of the original wetland intact, though some of that area has subsequently been returned to wetland conditions. Nonetheless, along with Poyang Lake, it remains one of the largest lakes in China, and is an important wintering area for migratory birds. It has been designated as a protected Ramsar site since 1992.

In 2007 fears were expressed that China's finless porpoise, a native of the lake, might follow the baiji, the Yangtze river dolphin, into extinction. There have been calls for action to save the finless porpoise, of which there are about 1400 left living, with approximately 700 to 900 in the Yangtze, and approximately another 500 in Poyang and Dongting Lakes.
The 2007 population levels were less than half the 1997 levels, and the population continues to drop at a rate of 7.3 per cent per year. Pressure on the finless porpoise population on Poyang Lake comes from the high numbers of ships passing through, as well as sand dredging.

After flooding of the Yangtze River in late June 2007, approximately 2 billion mice were displaced from the islands of the lake when water was released from the Three Gorges Dam to control the excess. The mice invaded surrounding communities, damaging crops and dikes and forcing the government to construct walls and ditches to control the population. Villagers killed an estimated 2 million mice by beating them to death or using poisons, which also had an adverse effect on their predators.

A restoration project, the Sino-Norwegian Project of Biodiversity Protection Management, began in 2005. According to a 2007 article in the China Daily, "[The Dongting Lake area] will be restored to a sustainable biodiversity environment within five to 10 years".

Major cities on the lake
 Yiyang
 Yueyang
 Changde

See also
 Eight Views of Xiaoxiang
 Emperor Shun
 Hunan
 Junshan Island
 Spotted bamboo
 Xiang River
 Xiang River goddesses
 Xiaoxiang
 Xiaoxiang poetry
 Yangzi River

References

Citations

Sources

External links

 The painting Returning Sails off a Distant Shore : in the Kyoto National Museum
 Dongting Hu seen from Yueyang
 Pictures from Dongting, Yueyang
 Saving the finless porpoise

Shrunken lakes
Lakes of Hunan
Ramsar sites in China